Ruth Everuss (born 4 August 1944) is an Australian former swimmer. She competed in the women's 4 × 100 metre freestyle relay at the 1960 Summer Olympics in Italy, Rome.

References

External links
 

1944 births
Living people
Australian female freestyle swimmers
Olympic swimmers of Australia
Swimmers at the 1960 Summer Olympics
Swimmers at the 1962 British Empire and Commonwealth Games
Commonwealth Games medallists in swimming
Commonwealth Games gold medallists for Australia
Swimmers from Sydney
20th-century Australian women
Medallists at the 1962 British Empire and Commonwealth Games